Opa Nguette (born 8 July 1994) is a professional footballer who plays for the Senegal national team. He plays as an attacking midfielder and striker. Nguette was a France youth international, having represented his nation at under-18 to under-20 level, before switching allegiance to Senegal.

Club career
Nguette began his football career playing for hometown club Mantes at amateur level in the Championnat de France amateur, the fourth level of French football. In the 2011–12 season, he made his competitive debut on 13 August 2011 playing for Mantes in a league match against Les Herbiers.

A week later, he departed Mantes to sign an aspirant (youth) contract with professional club Valenciennes. He made his professional debut on 11 August 2012 appearing as a substitute in a 1–0 win over Troyes.

International career
A former youth international for France, Nguette made his senior international debut in a friendly 1–1 tie with Senegal against Nigeria on 23 March 2017.

Career statistics

Club

International goals
Scores and results list Senegal's goal tally first.

Notes

References

External links
 
 
 

1994 births
Living people
People from Mantes-la-Jolie
Footballers from Yvelines
Senegalese footballers
Senegal international footballers
French footballers
France youth international footballers
French sportspeople of Senegalese descent
Association football forwards
FC Mantois 78 players
Valenciennes FC players
FC Metz players
Ligue 1 players
Ligue 2 players
Championnat National 2 players